is a district located in Sorachi Subprefecture, Hokkaido, Japan.

As of 2004, the district has an estimated population of 33,253 and a density of 65.71 persons per km2. The total area is 506.06 km2.

Towns and villages
Kuriyama
Naganuma
Yuni

Districts in Hokkaido